In social psychology, pluralistic ignorance (also known as a collective illusion) is a phenomenon which occurs when people mistakenly believe that everyone else holds a different opinion than their own. Most people in a group may go along with a view they do not agree with, because they incorrectly think that most other people in the group agree with it. It refers to a situation in which the minority position on a given topic is wrongly perceived to be the majority position or where the majority position is wrongly perceived to be the minority position. Pluralistic ignorance can arise due to a number of different factors. An individual may misjudge overall perceptions of a topic due to fear, embarrassment, social desirability, or social inhibition. Any of these can lead to the individual incorrectly perceiving the proportion of the general public who share similar beliefs to oneself. As such, pluralistic ignorance can only describe the coincidence of a belief with inaccurate perceptions, but not the process to get to those inaccurate perceptions. Thus, individuals may develop collective illusions when they feel they will receive backlash on their belief as they think it differs from society's belief.

A common example of pluralistic ignorance is the bystander effect, where individual onlookers may believe others are considering taking action, and may therefore themselves refrain from acting. This results in all the individual onlookers believing that the majority of onlookers are taking action, when in reality the minority or none of the onlookers take action.

Research
Prentice and Miller conducted a contemporary study on pluralistic ignorance, examining individuals beliefs on alcohol use and estimating the attitudes of their peers. The authors found that, on average, individual levels of comfort with drinking practices on campus were much lower than the perceived average. In one subset of experiments they traced the attitude change toward alcohol consumption of men versus women over the semester.  In men, the authors found a shifting of private attitudes toward this perceived norm, demonstrating a form of cognitive dissonance. Where women were found to have no shift in attitude over the course of the semester. Additionally, students perceived deviance from the social norm on alcohol use was correlated with various measures of campus alienation. Even though that deviance from the social norm was only perceived, it shows how isolation from the larger population can lead to larger differences between an individual's belief and the populations belief, leading to pluralistic ignorance. This study showed that the university students showcased pluralistic ignorance by individuals believing that the general populations comfort level with drinking practices was significantly higher than their personal comfort level, when in reality the individuals comfort level was quite similar to the general populations comfort level. 

Additional research has shown that pluralistic ignorance plagues not only those who indulge, but also those who abstain. Examples consist of individuals beliefs on traditional vices such as gambling, smoking and drinking to lifestyles such as vegetarianism. With the latter showcasing that pluralistic ignorance can be caused by the structure of the underlying social network, not exclusively cognitive dissonance, demonstrating how pluralistic ignorance can arise through a variety of methods.

The theory of pluralistic ignorance was studied by Floyd Henry Allport and his students Daniel Katz and Richard Schanck. He produced studies of racial stereotyping and prejudice, and attitude change, and his pursuit of the connections between individual psychology and social systems helped to found the field of organizational psychology. Elisabeth Noelle-Neumann, in her spiral of silence theory, argued that media biases lead to pluralistic ignorance.

Further behavioral economic and social psychology research was done by Todd Rose to demonstrate the interchangeability of the terms pluralistic ignorance and collective illusions. His findings of historical events, scientific studies and social media patterns indicate that by using either term you are saying the same thing. The societal systems like ours unconsciously participate in perpetuating false beliefs and narratives with a desire to fit in.

Examples
Pluralistic ignorance was blamed for exacerbating support for racial segregation in the United States. It has also been named a reason for the illusory popular support that kept the Communist Party of the Soviet Union in power, as many opposed the regime but assumed that others were supporters of it. Thus, most people were afraid to voice their opposition.

Another case of pluralistic ignorance concerns drinking on campus in countries where alcohol use is prevalent at colleges and universities. Students drink at weekend parties and sometimes at evening study breaks. Many drink to excess, some on a routine basis. The high visibility of heavy drinking on campus, combined with reluctance by students to show any public signs of concern or disapproval, gives rise to pluralistic ignorance: Students believe that their peers are much more comfortable with this behavior than they themselves feel.
 
Hans Christian Andersen's fairy tale  "The Emperor's New Clothes" is a famous fictional case of pluralistic ignorance. In this story two con artists come into the Emperor's kingdom and convince him that they make the finest clothes in all of the land that can only be seen by anyone who was not stupid. The con artists continued to steal gold, silk and other precious items for their "unique creation". Out of fear for being seen as stupid, all of the emperor's men and townspeople kept silent about the fact they could not see the emperor's clothes until finally a small child comes forth and says that the emperor isn't wearing any clothes. Once the child is willing to admit that he cannot see any clothes on the emperor, the emperor and townspeople finally admit that the emperor has been tricked and that there was never an outfit being made.

Pluralistic ignorance has also been blamed for large majorities of the public remaining silent on climate change—while 'solid majorities' of the American and UK public are concerned about climate change, most erroneously believe they are in the minority with their concern. It has been suggested that pollution-intensive industries have contributed to the public's underestimation of public support for climate solutions. For example, in the U.S., support for pollution pricing is high, yet public perception of public support is much lower.

In August 2022, Nature Communications published a survey with 6,119 representatively sampled Americans that found that 66 to 80% of Americans supported major climate change mitigation policies (i.e. 100% renewable energy by 2035, Green New Deal, carbon tax and dividend, renewable energy production siting on public land) and expressed climate concern, but that 80 to 90% of Americans underestimated the prevalence of support for such policies and such concern by their fellow Americans (with the sample estimating that only 37 to 43% on average supported such policies). Americans in every state and every assessed demographic (e.g. political ideology, racial group, urban/suburban/rural residence, educational attainment) underestimated support across all policies tested, and every state survey group and every demographic assessed underestimated support for the climate policies by at least 20%. The researchers attributed the misperception among the general public to pluralistic ignorance. Conservatives were found to underestimate support for the policies due to a false consensus effect, exposure to more conservative local norms, and consumption of conservative news, while liberals were suggested to underestimate support for the policies due to a false-uniqueness effect.

Men's conceptions of how they are expected to conform to norms of masculinity present additional examples of pluralistic ignorance. Specifically, most college age men are uncomfortable with other men "bragging about sexual acts and giving details," but erroneously believe themselves to be in the minority for their discomfort. Similarly, college age men underestimate other men's "desire to make sure they have consent when sexually active". This "role-conflict" can have deleterious consequences for men's physical and mental health, as well as for society. Netflix's "Derren Brown: The Push" explores some aspects of these concepts. 

According to a 2020 study, the vast majority of young married men in Saudi Arabia express private beliefs in support of women working outside the home but they substantially underestimate the degree to which other similar men support it. Once they become informed about the widespread nature of the support, they increasingly help their wives obtain jobs.

Consequences
Pluralistic ignorance has been linked to a wide range of deleterious consequences. Victims of pluralistic ignorance see themselves as deviant members of their peer group: less knowledgeable than their classmates, more uptight than their peers, less committed than their fellow board members, less competent than their fellow nurses (see the Dunning–Kruger effect operating in the opposite direction). This can leave them feeling bad about themselves and alienated from the group or institution of which they are a part. In addition, pluralistic ignorance can lead groups to persist in policies and practices that have lost widespread support: This can lead college students to persist in heavy drinking, corporations to persist in failing strategies, and governments to persist in unpopular foreign policies. At the same time, it can prevent groups from taking actions that would be beneficial in the long run: actions to intervene in an emergency, for example, or to initiate a personal relationship.

Pluralistic ignorance can be dispelled, and its negative consequences alleviated, through education. For example, students who learn that support for heavy drinking practices is not as widespread as they thought drink less themselves and feel more comfortable with the decision not to drink. Alcohol intervention programs now routinely employ this strategy to combat problem drinking on campus.

Misconceptions
Pluralistic ignorance can be contrasted with the false consensus effect. In pluralistic ignorance, people privately disdain but publicly support a norm (or a belief), while the false consensus effect causes people to wrongly assume that most people think like they do, while in reality most people do not think like they do (and express the disagreement openly). For instance, pluralistic ignorance may lead a student to drink alcohol excessively because she believes that everyone else does that, while in reality everyone else also wishes they could avoid binge drinking, but no one expresses that due to the fear of being ostracized. A false consensus for the same situation would mean that the student believes that most other people do not enjoy excessive drinking, while in fact most other people do enjoy that and openly express their opinion about it.

A study undertaken by Greene, House, and Ross used simple circumstantial questionnaires on Stanford undergrads to gather information on the false consensus effect. They compiled thoughts on the choice they felt people would or should make, considering traits such as shyness, cooperativeness, trust, and adventurousness. Studies found that when explaining their decisions, participants gauged choices based on what they explained as "people in general" and their idea of "typical" answers. For each of the stories those subjects said that they personally would follow a given behavioral alternative also tended to rate that alternative as relatively probable for "people in general": those subjects who claimed that they would reject the alternative tended to rate it as relatively improbable for "people in general". It was evident that the influence of the subjects' own behavior choice affected the estimates of commonness. Although it would seem as if the two are built on the same premise of social norms, they take two very oppositional stances on a similar phenomenon. The false consensus effect considers that in predicting an outcome, people will assume that the masses agree with their opinion and think the same way they do on an issue, whereas the opposite is true of pluralistic ignorance, where the individual does not agree with a certain action but go along with it anyway, believing that their view is not shared with the masses (which is usually untrue).

See also

Abilene paradox
Asch conformity experiments
Common knowledge (logic)
Conformity
Die Wende
Glasnost
Groupthink
Mutual knowledge
Peer pressure
Political correctness
Prisoner's dilemma
Preference falsification
Silent majority
Spiral of silence
Social norms approach
Stag hunt
Thomas theorem

References

Conformity
Attitude attribution
Ignorance
Group processes